Goodwill or good will may also refer to:
 Goodwill (accounting), the value of a business entity not directly attributable to its assets and liabilities
Goodwill ambassador, occupation or title of a person that advocates a cause
 Goodwill Games, a former international sports competition (1986–2000)
 Goodwill Industries, a non-profit organization
 Goodwill Entertainments, an Indian motion picture and distribution company
 Goodwill tour, a tour by someone or something famous to a series of places
 The Goodwill, a post-hardcore band from Long Island, New York formed in 2001
 , a United States Navy patrol boat in commission from 1917 or 1918 until the end of 1918

People with the name
 Goodwill Zwelithini kaBhekuzulu, the former king of the Zulu nation
 Tommy Goodwill (1894–1916), English footballer

Places
 Goodwill, a Free Village in Saint James Parish, Jamaica
 Goodwill, a suburb of Roseau, Dominica
 Goodwill, Maryland, United States
 Goodwill, West Virginia, United States

See also
Good Will Hunting, a 1997 film directed by Gus Van Sant
Social capital, the goodwill of social groups, in sociology and public health
Good faith, the mental and moral state of honesty